Renato Rocha (born 4 July 1975 in Rio de Janeiro) is a Brazilian singer-songwriter, guitarist and keyboardist famous for his work with alternative rock band Detonautas Roque Clube.

Career
Renato has been playing for Detonautas since its formation in 1997. He was invited to join Detonautas by Tico Santa Cruz at a chatroom, equal to other members.

Activism
Rocha often participates in protests with Tico Santa Cruz against the immunity from prosecution for Brazilian corrupt politicians and criminals, often bringing many fans.

References

External links 
1. Detonautas Roque Clube 2. Renato Rocha on Twitter

1975 births
Living people
Brazilian keyboardists
Brazilian activists
Brazilian rock musicians
Brazilian classical guitarists
Brazilian male guitarists
Musicians from Rio de Janeiro (city)
20th-century Brazilian male singers
20th-century Brazilian singers
21st-century Brazilian male singers
21st-century Brazilian singers
21st-century guitarists
Brazilian male singer-songwriters